Francisco Vinyals Bou (Barcelona, 10 December 1897 – April 1951) was a Spanish footballer who played as a winger with FC Barcelona for his intire career which spanned 12 years between 1914 and 1926. He was one of the first footballers to play for Barcelona for his entire career, and thus be part of the so-called one-club men group.

Club career
Born and raised in Barcelona, he began his career at his hometown club FC Barcelona, making his debut on 25 October 1914 against UE Sant Andreu in a Catalan championship match.

Vinyals played for Barça for more than a decade, being a regular in the starting line-ups from the 1914–15 season until the 1924–25 season. He played a total of 103 official matches (15 in the Copa del Rey and 88 in the Catalan championship), netting 12 goals. In total, he played 349 unofficial matches. Vinyals was a member of the first golden generation of the club, which was coached by Jack Greenwell, and included Paulino Alcántara, Sagibarba, Félix Sesúmaga, Ricardo Zamora and Josep Samitier. Together with them, he helped Barça win 7 Catalan championships, along with five Copa del Rey finals in 1919, 1920, 1922, 1925 and 1926, winning the latter four, but oddly, the final in which Vinyals managed to score a goal was the one which they lost in 1919, ending in a 2–5 loss to Arenas de Getxo, courtesy of a hat-trick from Félix Sesúmaga.

Vinyals was honored with a tributed match on 14 April 1918, which was held at the Camp de la Indústria when he was still an active player. Just over a year before, on 4 February 1917, fellow one-club Barça men Ramón Torralba had become the first player in the history of Barcelona to be granted a tributed match. He played his last match for Barça on 4 April 1926 against Real Zaragoza in the Copa del Rey, and so, on 19 June 1927, he was the subject of another tribute match together with Ramon Bruguera, this time in Les Corts. His brother Josep Vinyals also played for Barça but only in unofficial matches. Along with his brother, he was an outstanding long-distance runner.

Honours

Club
FC Barcelona

Catalan championship:
Champions (7): 1915–16, 1918–19, 1919–20, 1920–21, 1921–22, 1923–24, 1924–25

Copa del Rey:
Champions (4): 1920, 1922, 1925 and 1926
Runner-up (1): 1919

References

1897 births
1951 deaths
FC Barcelona players
Footballers from Barcelona
Spanish footballers
Catalonia international footballers
Lists of one-club men
Association football wingers